Holst  and von Holst are surnames. In Denmark and Norway they are of Medieval origin, meaning Holsatian (person from Holstein). They may refer to:

Holst
Alison Holst (born 1938), New Zealand food writer and television chef
Amalia Holst (1758-1829), German writer, intellectual, and feminist
Arne Holst (1904–1991), Norwegian bobsledder
Axel Holst (1860–1931), Norwegian professor of hygiene and bacteriology
Bodil Holst, Danish physicist
Carl Holst (born 1970), Danish politician
Christian Holst (born 1981), Danish/Faroese football player
Dagmar Holst, German rower
Eduard Holst (1843–1899), Danish actor, dancer, playwright and composer
Elise Holst (1811–1891), Danish stage actress.
Erika Holst (born 1979), Swedish ice hockey player
Ewout Holst (born 1978), Dutch swimmer
Frederik Holst (1791–1871), Norwegian medical doctor
Gilda Holst (born 1952), Ecuadorian writer
Gilles Holst (1886–1968), Dutch physicist
Gustav Holst (1874–1934), English composer
Hanne-Vibeke Holst (born 1959), Danish author
Hans Faye Holst (1788–1843), Norwegian politician
Hans Holst, 17th century Danish woodcarver
Henning Holst (1891–1975), Danish field hockey player
Imogen Holst (1907–1984), British conductor, composer and writer, daughter of Gustav Holst
Johan Jørgen Holst (1937–1994), Norwegian politician
Johan Throne Holst (1868–1946), Norwegian industrialist and politician
Kai Holst (1913–1945), Norwegian resistance fighter and member of Milorg
Knut Holst, Norwegian Nordic skier
Lars Holst (1848–1915), Norwegian journalist, newspaper editor and politician
Peter Theodor Holst (1843–1908), Norwegian politician
Poul Christian Holst (1776–1863), Norwegian government official
Spencer Holst (1926–2001), American writer and storyteller
Svea Holst (1901–1996), Swedish film actress
Theodor von Holst (1810–1844), English painter
Thomas Holst (born 1964),  German serial killer 
Timothy Holst (1947–2009), American ringmaster
Toke Holst (born 1981), Danish handballer
Waldemar Holst (1907–1975), German Korvettenkapitän

von Holst
Erich von Holst (1908–1962), German behavioral physiologist
Erik von Holst (1894–1962), Estonian/German ice yacht designer and sailor 
Hermann Eduard von Holst (1841–1904), Estonian-German-American historian
Hermann V. von Holst (1874–1955), American architect
Johan Hübner von Holst (1881–1945), Swedish sport shooter

Other
Maria van der Holst-Blijlevens (born 1946), Dutch sprint canoer
Niels Holst-Sørensen (born 1922), commander-in-chief of the Danish Air Force and European champion athlete
Jon Holst-Christensen (born 1968), Danish retired male badminton player
Joachim Holst-Jensen (1880–1963), Norwegian film actor
June Holst-Roness (1929–2008), mayor of Freetown, Sierra Leone

See also
 Holst Township, Clearwater County, Minnesota
 Holst's frog
 Holst Singers
 3590 Holst

Germanic-language surnames
Norwegian-language surnames
Danish-language surnames

ja:ホルスト